In the 2004–05 Egyptian Premier League, 14 teams participated. The first-placed team was the champion, and qualified to the CAF Champions League 2006 along with the team finishing in second place. The third-placed team qualified to the CAF Confederation Cup. Finally, the bottom three in the league are relegated to play the next season in the second division.

Each team played 26 matches from September 2004 to April 2005. Al Ahly were crowned champions by a 31-point margin and did not lose a game during the campaign (only dropping four points via two draws), a feat they repeated the following season.

League table

2004–05 in African association football leagues
0
Premier